Kafra, was a Palestinian  Arab village located 10.5 kilometres north of Baysan. Built along both sides of the Wadi Kafra, the village had been known by this name since at least the time of the Crusades.  It was depopulated by the Israel Defense Forces during the 1948 Palestine War on May 16, 1948.

History
Adolf Neubauer connected it with a  place mentioned in the Talmud, called Kefra.

The  Crusaders  spelled it Cafra.

Ottoman era
In 1875, Victor Guérin visited and found many basalt ruins, but the village itself was deserted.

In 1882, the PEF's Survey of Western Palestine described the village as being "a ruined village with traces of antiquity. Dr. Tristram mentions it as inhabited in 1866, and containing drafted masonry, but the ruins do not appear important."

British mandate era
In  the 1922 census of Palestine, conducted by the  Mandatory Palestine authorities,  Kafra had a population of 273; all Muslims, increasing slightly in the  1931 census   to 298; all  Muslims except 1 Christian, in a total of 81  houses.

In  the  1945 statistics, the population was 430 Muslims, with a total of 9,172 dunams of land.  Of this, 36 dunams were for plantations and irrigated land, 7,284   for cereals, while 18 were built-up land.

References

Bibliography

External links
 Welcome To Kafra
 Kafra, Zochrot 
Survey of Western Palestine, Map 9:     IAA, Wikimedia commons

Arab villages depopulated during the 1948 Arab–Israeli War